Collagen beta(1-O)galactosyltransferase 1 is a protein that in humans is encoded by the COLGALT1 gene.

Function

The protein encoded by this gene is one of two enzymes that transfers galactose moieties to hydroxylysine residues of collagen and mannose binding lectin. This gene is constitutively expressed and encodes a soluble protein that localizes to the endoplasmic reticulum.

References

Further reading